is a Japanese anime screenwriter.

Works

Television
 series head writer denoted in bold
Flower Witch Mary Bell (1992)
Calimero (1993)
Brave Police J-Decker (1994)
Slayers (1995)
The Brave of Gold Goldran (1995)
El-Hazard: The Wanderers (1995-1996)
 Those Who Hunt Elves (1996)
 Brave Command Dagwon (1996)
 Slayers NEXT (1996)
 Slayers TRY (1997)
 Those Who Hunt Elves 2 (1997)
 Maze (1997)
 Vampire Princess Miyu (1997-1998)
 Lost Universe (1998)
 Record of Lodoss War: Chronicles of the Heroic Knight (1998)
 Mamotte Shugogetten (1998)
 Sorcerous Stabber Orphen (1998-1999)
 Sorcerous Stabber Orphen 2: Revenge (1999-2000)
 Boys Be... (2000)
 Baki the Grappler (2001)
 A Little Snow Fairy Sugar (2001-2002)
 Ai Yori Aoshi  (2002)
 Petite Princess Yucie (2002-2003)
 Divergence Eve (2003)
 The Galaxy Railways (2003-2004)
 Misaki Chronicles (2004)
 Daphne in the Brilliant Blue (2004)
 Basilisk (2005)
 Mahoraba ~Heartful Days~ (2005)
 Comic Party Revolution (2005): eps 5-13
 Karin (2005-2006)
 Angel Heart (2005-2006)
 Love Get Chu: Miracle Seiyū Hakusho (2006)
 Animal Yokocho (2006)
 Tsuyokiss Cool x Sweet (2006)
 BakéGyamon (2006-2007)
 The Galaxy Railways II: Crossroads to Eternity (2006-2007)
 Strain: Strategic Armored Infantry (2006-2007)
 Venus Versus Virus (2007)
 Idolmaster: Xenoglossia (2007)
 Sky Girls (2007)
 Bakugan Battle Brawlers (2007-2008)
 Slayers REVOLUTION (2008)
 Yozakura Quartet (2008)
 Net Ghost PiPoPa (2008-2009)
 Slayers EVOLUTION-R (2009)
 Juden Chan (2009)
 Ladies versus Butlers! (2010)
 Motto To Love Ru (2010)
 Fortune Arterial (2010)
 Bakugan Battle Brawlers: New Vestroia (2010-2011)
 Bakugan: Gundalian Invaders (2011)
 R-15 (2011)
 Maken-ki! (2011)
 Manyū Hiken-chō (2011)
 Problem Children Are Coming from Another World, Aren’t They? (2013)
 A Certain Scientific Railgun S (2013)
 Haiyore! Nyaruko-san W (2013)
 Maken-ki! Two (2014)
 Absolute Duo (2015)
 The Testament of Sister New Devil BURST (2015)
 Turning Mecard (2015-2016)
 Battle Spirits: Burning Soul (2015-2016)
 Hybrid x Heart Magias Academy Ataraxia (2016)
 Battle Spirits: Double Drive (2016-2017)
 Twin Star Exorcists (2016-2017)
Elegant Yokai Apartment Life (2017)
 My Girlfriend is Shobitch (2017)
 Ongaku Shōjo (2018)
 Didn’t I Say to Make My Abilities Average in the Next Life? (2019)
 Gundam Build Divers Re:Rise (2019-2020)
 Uzaki-chan Wants to Hang Out! (2020)
 WIXOSS Diva (A)Live (2021)

OVAs
 Deadman Wonderland: Wielder of the Red Knife (2011)
 The Testament of Sister New Devil DEPARTURES (2018)

References

External links
 

Japanese writers
Living people
Year of birth missing (living people)
Place of birth missing (living people)